The 2014 season was the 109th season of competitive football in Norway.

The season began in March, and ended in November with the 2014 Norwegian Football Cup Final.

Men's football

League season

Tippeligaen

1. divisjon

2. divisjon

Group 1

Group 2

Group 3

Group 4

3. divisjon

Norwegian Cup

Final

Women's football

League season

Toppserien

1. divisjon

Norwegian Women's Cup

Final
LSK Kvinner 3–1 Trondheims-Ørn

Men's UEFA competitions

Champions League

Qualifying phase

Second qualifying round

|}

UEFA Europa League

Qualifying phase

First qualifying round

|}

Second qualifying round

|}

Third qualifying round

|}

UEFA Women's Champions League

Knockout phase

Round of 32

|}

National teams

Norway men's national football team

Norway women's national football team

References

 
Seasons in Norwegian football